The National Basketball League Most Valuable Player Award (MVP) was an annual National Basketball League (NBL) award given to the best performing player of the regular season in each of the twelve years the league existed. The MVP was selected by sports writers, broadcasters, coaches, and managers.

Winners

See also
 NBA Most Valuable Player Award

References
General

Specific

Most Valuable
Awards established in 1938
Basketball most valuable player awards
1938 establishments in the United States